The Georgia Safe Dams Program is part of the Environmental Protection Division of the Georgia Department of Natural Resources. The Safe Dams Program must:

 Reinventory existing low hazard (Category II) dams at least every five years.
 Classify dams based on development within the dam failure flood zone downstream.
 Approve plans and specifications for construction and repair of all high hazard (Category I) dams.
 Continuously monitor Category I dams for safety.

Category I dams might result in loss of human life upon failure or improper operation; Category II would not.

Notes 

Water management authorities in the United States
Dams in Georgia (U.S. state)
Dam-related organizations
State agencies of Georgia (U.S. state)